The Peak of Puigmal, also called Puigmal d'Er, is a mountain in the Pyrenees, in the Spanish-French border, within the limits of the municipality of Queralbs and the commune of Err.
Puigmal d'Err is near the west end of a fine ridge over 2500m high for 16 km. The west half is composed of friable metasediments (schists) which break down to form smooth slopes, and so give easy walking. The east half is of tougher gneiss and forms spiky alpine scenery with sharp crests and some difficult places. Several excellent circuits can be made from Nuria. 
The plateau summit of Puigmal d'Err is split for several hundred metres by a bold scarp, in places over 20 metres high, with the eastern half having slipped bodily towards Nuria. This is clearly seen on GoogleEarth. Several other crests in this range are likewise split.

See also
Vall de Núria
List of mountains in Catalonia

References

Mountains of the Pyrenees
Mountains of Pyrénées-Orientales
Mountains of Catalonia
International mountains of Europe
France–Spain border
Emblematic summits of Catalonia